St George's School, Windsor Castle is a co-educational independent preparatory school in Windsor, near London, England. Founded to provide choirboys for the Choir of St George's Chapel, it now educates over 400 boys and girls.

History
The school was established to provide six choristers for the Choir of St George's Chapel, Windsor Castle, which sings in St George's Chapel at Windsor Castle, which is the official country residence of the British Royal Family. St George's is one of the oldest schools in the country, and has provided an unbroken line of boy choristers to sing daily services in St George's Chapel since 1352.

As late as 1942 the school was reported by its headmaster as being "for the sons of Gentlemen only".

The school's choristers have sung at events such as the wedding of Prince Edward and Sophie Rhys-Jones, now the Countess of Wessex; the funeral of John Hunt, Baron Hunt; and also the Blessing of the Wedding of the now King Charles III and Queen Camilla.

Present day
The seventeen full choristers live at the school, with about seven 'probationers' who are mostly day pupils. The choristers attend lessons at the school with the other children and rehearse each day before and after school in the Song School by the Chapel, where they also sing seven services each week during term time.  Their school fees are partly met by grants from the Dean and Canons of Windsor.

The school has a boarding community of 30 children, many of whom board on weekly or flexible arrangements. Most pupils have experienced some level of boarding before they leave at 13.

The school buildings are situated just below the north wall of Windsor Castle, with the school being divided into three distinct sections – the Pre-Prep (Nursery to Year 2) the Middle School (Years 3, 4 and 5) and the Senior School (Years 6, 7 and 8).

Nearly all pupils over the age of 7 learn an instrument, the majority of girls take part in ballet, tap or jazz dancing and a range of school choirs covers all age-groups.

Although the school is a town centre school, spacious playing fields are situated next door to the school site, within the King's private grounds. Boys play football, rugby and cricket and the girls play netball, hockey and rounders. Swimming takes place in the school's indoor pool.

In 2021, the house names were changed from Revenge, Rodney, Vindictive and Victory, to Garter, Clarence, Lancaster and Winchester. They are now named after the towers at Windsor Castle. The original houses were named after warships.

Headmasters
1893–95: A. Bickerseth
1885–1904: H. F. W. Deane
1904–34: G. S. Fowler
1934–42: James William Webb-Jones
1942–45: P. H. C. Cavanaugh (acting headmaster)
1946–71: W. P. O. Cleave
1971–83: Richard Russell
1983–92: George Hill
1992–93: Bernard Biggs
1993: Anthony Brailsford (acting headmaster)
1993–95: Alan Mould
1995–99: Roger Marsh
1999: Alan Mould (interregnum; autumn term)
2000–11: Roger Jones
2011–12: Andrew Salmond-Smith 
2012-17: Chris McDade 
2017-2018: Roger Jones
2019– William Goldsmith

Notable pupils
 Princess Eugenie of York (born 1990), daughter of The Duke of York and granddaughter of Queen Elizabeth II
 Lady Louise Mountbatten-Windsor (born 2003), daughter of The Duke of Edinburgh and granddaughter of Queen Elizabeth II
 Sir Walford Davies (1869–1941), composer.
 Timothy Bavin (born 1935), Anglican bishop
 Michael Chance (born 1955), countertenor
 John Denison (1911–2006), music administrator
 David Fanshawe (1942–2010), classical composer
 John David Morley (born 1948), writer and novelist
 Francis Grier (born 1955), classical composer
 Miles Jupp (born 1979), comedian
 John Lubbock (born 1979), conductor

See also
 List of the oldest schools in the world
 St George's Chapel at Windsor Castle

Notes

External links
School website
ISI Inspection Reports
Ofsted boarding report 2007
History of the Choristers at St George's Chapel
Choir Schools Association

Choir schools in England
1348 establishments in England
Windsor Castle
Educational institutions established in the 14th century
Preparatory schools in Berkshire
Private schools in the Royal Borough of Windsor and Maidenhead